Donahue is the Americanized version of Irish surname Donohoe, which, in turn, is an Anglicized version of the ancient Irish name "Donnchadh" (sometimes "Donncha").   

Donncha was a common “first name” in 9th Century Ireland, and when the use of surnames became more common in Ireland around the 10th Century, many people looked to a respected common ancestor to form a surname. The ancestors of the modern Donahues took the name O’Donnchadha, meaning "the son of Donnacha" or "of the line of Donnacha". The modern Donahues are descended from one of at least eight unrelated Donnachas, each of whose descendants adopted the surname O’Donnchadha. 

There are eight known O'Donoghue tribal areas in Ireland; in Munster the areas of Tipperary, Cork and Kerry, then there are Kilkenny, Wicklow, Dublin and Meath in Leinster and in Connaught there are Galway, Mayo, Sligo and Cavan. Considerable migration took place over the centuries and family groups took root in many other counties (e.g. Clare, Limerick, Waterford, Roscommon, and others), which would today be recognised as their areas of origin. 

The Donohoes of the ancient Kingdom of Breifne, centered in modern-day County Cavan, are genetically linked to 4th-century Irish warlord Niall of the Nine Hostages.

When the name O’Donnchadha became Anglicized, at least 30 different spellings developed in Ireland, but by the 19th century the most common spelling was "Donohoe." Of 2,800 families reporting variations of the name at the time of Griffith's Valuation (1847–1864), 2,483, or 88%, were listed as “Donohoe.” None were listed as “Donahue.” The name distribution geographically during this same period reflects that there were significant clusters of Donohoes found in various parts of Ireland, including County Cavan, County Cork, County Galway, and County Kerry.  

The name Donahue may refer to one of several people:

Ann Donahue (born 1955), American television writer
Archie Donahue (1917–2007), American Marine flying ace during World War II
Art Donahue (1913–1942), American pilot who flew for the Royal Air Force during the Battle of Britain
Chris Donahue (born 1969), American general
Cornelius Donahue (1850–1878), American Old West outlaw
Dylan Donahue (born 1992), American football player
Edward Donahue, American college sports coach
Elinor Donahue (born 1937), American actress
Heather Donahue (born 1974), American actress
Jack Donahue (1804–1830), Australian outlaw
Jerry Donahue (born 1946), American guitarist
Jiggs Donahue (1879–1913), American baseball player
Jim Donahue (1862–1935), American baseball player
John Donahue (baseball), American baseball player
John F. "Jack" Donahue, American founder of Federated Investors
Jonathan Donahue, American rock guitarist
Joseph Donahue (born 1954), American poet
Joseph Patrick Donahue (1870–1959), American Catholic bishop
Laura Kent Donahue (born 1949), American politician
Megan Donahue, American astronomer
Mike Donahue (1871–1960), American athlete and football coach
Pat Donahue (1884–1966), American baseball player
Patty Donahue (1956–1996), American New Wave singer
Phil Donahue (born 1935), American talk show host
Francis Rostell "Red" Donahue (1873–1913), American baseball player
Sam Donahue (1918–1974), American saxophonist
Terry Donahue (1944–2021), American football coach and executive
Terry Donahue (baseball) (1925–2019), Canadian professional baseball player
Tom Donahue (DJ) (1928–1975), American disc jockey, record producer and concert promoter
Tom Donahue (filmmaker) (born 1968), American film director and producer
Thomas Michael Donahue (1921–2004), American astronomer 
Thomas R. Donahue (born 1928), American organized labor activist
Tim Donahue (1870–1902), American baseball player
Timothy Donahue, American executive

Other uses
Donahue, Iowa, a small city in the United States
The Phil Donahue Show, also known as Donahue

See also 
Donohue
O'Donoghue
Ross Castle, ancestral home of the O'Donoghue clan, in County Kerry
Justice Donahue (disambiguation)

Americanized surnames